The Women's eight competition at the 2012 Summer Olympics in London took place are at Dorney Lake which, for the purposes of the Games venue, is officially termed Eton Dorney.

Schedule

All times are British Summer Time (UTC+1)

Results

Heats
First team of each heat qualify to the final, remainder goes to the repechage.

Heat 1

Heat 2

Repechage
First four qualify to the final.

Final

References

Women's eight
Women's eight